Louise Cosseron Bourbonnaud was born in Paris (c. 1847–1915) and was a French writer, explorer and philanthropist. who helped found the Relief Society for the Wounded of the Land and Sea Armies, which went on to become the French Red Cross. She also contributed to hospitals and a nursery in Paris.

Biography 
Louise Cosseron married the wealthy Parisian entrepreneur Étienne Bourbonnaud, who created the city's Boulevard Barbès with his friend, city urban planner Baron Haussmann and engineer Adolphe Alphand.

Philanthropists, the Bourbonnaud couple devoted their great fortune to help the poorest residents of Paris. Courageous, they faced the insurgents of the Commune in 1871 who tried to seize their property during uprisings there.

After Étienne died in 1875 at 48, Louise Bourbonnaud decided to continue her philanthropy and follow her passion for travel allowing her to discover and write about the world and its inhabitants.

Traveler 
Intrepid, determined, reckless and eager to learn, she traveled alone across the American continents (the North in 1885, the Center and the Caribbean in 1886, and finally the South in 1887). At each stop, she sought out members of the working class who she called "the most humble people," and took copious notes for publication on her return to Paris.

In her travel writings, she made a point of contradicting prevailing social attitudes toward adventurous women.How impressionable is woman’s nature! The slightest thing upsets her, frightens her, makes her lose her head! How incomplete is her organization in sangfroid, presence of mind, and composure in the face of the hardships that life is filled with and which confront her at every step. What would she do without a man? How could she get along, poor thing? Well, I, a woman, wanted to show that those ideas enumerated above about women were getting very stale and out-of-date. Still young, in possession of a rather decent fortune, and a widow - that is to say, mistress of my actions - I set out upon my journey around the world.In 1888, she visited India, Sri Lanka, Borneo, Sumatra, Vietnam, China and Japan. In the following years, she undertook a series of trips to Africa, Europe and returned to America. Along the way she faced many difficult situations, including attacks by brigands and crooks.

Philanthropist 
An eminent Parisian, Louise Bourbonnaud did not hesitate to use her many, highly placed friends to rally support for the most disadvantaged in the capital city. She financed (and co-financed) foundations, hospitals and a nursery, especially in her neighborhood, the 18th arrondissement.

She actively participated in the founding of the Relief Society for the Wounded of the Land and Sea Armies, which later became known as the French Red Cross.

Exploration prize
She created the Louise Bourbonnaud Prize in 1891 and endowed it with the Société de Géographie de Paris. The prize was intended to reward great travelers of French origin, and it was given each year in her name.

 In 1892, the gold medal and prize money went to Henri Coudreau for his ten-year exploration of French Guiana from 1881-1891. 
 In 1895, the award went to Father Élie Colin for his work in Madagascar. 
 In 1906 The prize was awarded to Mr. R. Avelot.
Marie Anne de Bovet also received the award, date unknown.

Final years 
She was honored by Gilbert Nabonnand with the naming of the “Louise-Bourbonnaud” tea rose, bred in 1892.

Bourbonnaud died 19 March 1915 at the age of 68 and is buried next to her husband in the Père-Lachaise Cemetery, in Paris (56th division).

Works 
Louise Bourbonnaud recounted her adventures in three books. 
 Les Amériques: Amérique du nord, les Antilles, Amérique du sud. (Americas: North America, West Indies, South America) L. Vanier, 1889.
 India and the Far East, travel impressions of a Parisian woman, Paris, 1892
 Alone across 145,000 land, sea and air leagues, Paris.

References 

1847 births
1915 deaths
Writers from Paris
French non-fiction writers
Female travelers
French women writers
Women travel writers
19th-century French women writers
Philanthropists from Paris